Nazi Literature in the Americas is a work of fiction by the Chilean author Roberto Bolaño. It was published in 1996. Chris Andrews’ English translation was published in 2008 by New Directions and was shortlisted for the 2008 Best Translated Book Award.

Summary

Nazi Literature in the Americas presents itself as an encyclopedia of right-wing writers. The book is composed of short biographies of imaginary Pan-American authors. The literary Nazis—fascists and ultra-right sympathizers and zealots, most from South America, a few from North America—portrayed in that book are a gallery of self-deluded mediocrities, snobs, opportunists, narcissists, and criminals. About Nazi Literature in the Americas, Bolaño told an interviewer:
(Its) focus is on the world of the ultra right, but much of the time, in reality, I'm talking about the left... When I'm talking about Nazi writers in the Americas, in reality I'm talking about the world, sometimes heroic but much more often despicable, of literature in general.

Although the writers are invented, they are all carefully situated in real literary worlds: Bolaño's characters rebuff Allen Ginsberg’s advances in Greenwich Village, encounter Octavio Paz in Mexico City, and quarrel with José Lezama Lima in Cuba.

Forerunners to this type of fictional writer biographies can be seen in the short stories of Jorge Luis Borges, particularly "Pierre Menard, Author of the Quixote" and "An Examination of the Work of Herbert Quain".  Bolaño has also praised the work of J. Rodolfo Wilcock, a member of Borges' cohort, whose "La Sinagoga de Los Iconoclastas" (Temple of the Iconoclasts) similarly consists of short biographies of imaginary figures, in Wilcock's case, crackpot scholars and inventors.

Contents
The Mendiluce Clan
Presents the Argentinian poet Edelmira Thompson de Mendiluce, her son Juan Mendiluce Thompson, and her daughter Luz Mendiluce Thompson. Edelmira, among other ventures, attempts to create a room based on Edgar Allan Poe's essay "Philosophy of Furniture" and founds The Fourth Reich in Argentina, a literary magazine and publishing house which publish works by several of the writers appearing later in the book. Juan is a novelist and politician while Luz is a talented but troubled poet who suffers failed marriages, struggles with alcoholism and overweight, and is eventually doomed by her love for a much younger woman.
 Itinerant Heroes or the Fragility of Mirrors
 Ignacio Zubieta
 Jesús Fernández-Gómez
 Forerunners and Figures of the Anti-Enlightenment
 Mateo Aguirre Bengoechea
 Silvio Salvático
 Luiz Fontaine Da Souza
 Ernesto Pérez Masón
 Poètes Maudits
 Pedro González Carrera
 Andres Cepeda Cepeda, known as The Page
 Wandering Women of Letters
 Irma Carrasco
 Daniela de Montecristo
 Two Germans at the Ends of the Earth
 Franz Zwickau
 Willy Schürholz
 Speculative and Science Fiction
 J.M.S. Hill
 Zach Sodenstern
 Gustavo Borda
 Magicians, Mercenaries and Miserable Creatures
 Segundo José Heredia
 Amado Couto
 Carlos Hevia
 Harry Sibelius
 The Many Masks of Max Mirebalais
 Max Mirebalais, alias Max Kasimir, Max von Hauptman, Max Le Gueule, Jacques Artibonito
 North American Poets
 Jim O'Bannon
 Rory Long
 The Aryan Brotherhood
 Thomas R. Murchison, alias The Texan
 John Lee Brook
 The Fabulous Schiaffino Boys
 Italo Schiaffino
 Argentino Schiaffino, alias Fatso
 The Infamous Ramírez Hoffman
This section differs in tone from the rest of the book, rather than being delivered as a dry encyclopedic entry it is narrated by a character, named Bolaño, who was a witness to some of the events. The story was later expanded into the novella Distant Star, with the name of the protagonist changed to Alberto Ruiz-Tagle. this is explained in the introduction to the novel thus:
In the final chapter of my novel Nazi Literature in the Americas I recounted, in less than twenty pages and perhaps too schematically, the story of Lieutenant Ramirez Hoffman of the Chilean Air Force, which I heard from a fellow Chilean, Arturo B. [...] He was not satisfied with my version [...] So we took that final chapter and shut ourselves up for a month and a half in my house in Blanes, where, guided by his dreams and nightmares, we composed the present novel.
 Epilogue for Monsters
 Secondary Figures
 Publishing Houses, Magazines, Places...
 Books

Quotes
 "That was not to be Pérez Masón’s last visit to the jails of socialist Cuba. In 1965 he published Poor Man’s Soup, which related — in an irreproachable style, worthy of Sholokov — the hardships of a large family living in Havana in 1950. The novel comprised fourteen chapters.  The first began: “Lucia was a black woman from...”; the second: “Only after serving her father...”; the third: “Nothing had come easily for Juan...”; the fourth: “Gradually, tenderly, she drew him towards her...”  The censor quickly smelled a rat. The first letters of each chapter made up the acrostic LONG LIVE HITLER. A major scandal broke out. Pérez Masón defended himself haughtily: it was a simple coincidence. The censors set to work in earnest, and made a fresh discovery: the first letters of each chapter’s second paragraph made up another acrostic—THIS PLACE SUCKS. And those of the third paragraph spelled: USA WHERE ARE YOU. And the fourth paragraph: KISS MY CUBAN ASS. And so, since each chapter, without exception, contained twenty-five paragraphs, the censors and the general public soon discovered twenty-five acrostics. I screwed up, Pérez Masón would say later: They were too obvious, but if I’d made it much harder, no one would have realized."

Critical reception
Stacey D'Erasmo, in a review for The New York Times, describes Nazi Literature in the Americas as:
“a wicked, invented encyclopedia of imaginary fascist writers and literary tastemakers, is Bolaño playing with sharp, twisting knives. As if he were Borges’s wisecracking, sardonic son, Bolaño has meticulously created a tightly woven network of far-right littérateurs and purveyors of belles lettres for whom Hitler was beauty, truth and great lost hope." 

Michael Dirda, of The Washington Post found that the novel, "very much deserves reading: It is imaginative, full of a love for literature, and, unlikely as it may seem, exceptionally entertaining." John Brenkman of The Village Voice sees the book as both a satire and an elegy, stating, "Nazi Literature in the Americas is first of all a prank, an act of genius wasting its time in parodic attacks on a hated sort of writer. But beyond that, it produces an unsettling mix of overt satire and covert elegy. The reductive force of summary after summary starts to have an effect that transcends the satire; the book begins to convey a sense of the vanity of human endeavor and the ease with which a lifetime's work might be flicked into oblivion by a witty remark."
Giles Harvey, writing for The New Yorker, included the novel in his list of Bolaño's best work, explaining that:
"This mock reference book of imaginary right-wing litterateurs — including soccer-hooligans-cum poets and a sci-fi novelist who excitedly envisages Hitler’s Reich triumphing in the United States — is every bit as fun as it sounds. Like David Thomson’s Biographical Dictionary of Film or, indeed, Philip Rees’s non-fictional Biographical Dictionary of the Extreme Right, Nazi Literature is not a book to read straight through, but rather to dip into whenever the mood (in this case a rather dark, antisocial mood) takes you."

In a dissenting opinion Alberto Manguel, writing for The Guardian, finds the novel is,
"at first mildly amusing but quickly becomes a tedious pastiche of itself. Like a joke whose punchline is given in the title, the humour is undermined, and all that is left is a series of names, dates and titles that, since they don't come across as funny, become merely irritating [...] It is not enough to invent a character and lend it a name and a bibliography and a few circumstantial details; something must justify its existence on the page, which otherwise risks resembling an annotated phonebook."

Paul Grimstad of Columbia University wonders whether the idea of the work was hinted by a Stanislaw Lem's review of a fictional book Gruppenführer Louis XVI in the collection  A Perfect Vacuum.

References

External links
"The Sound and the Führer" by  Stacey D'Erasmo, New York Times, February 24, 2008.
Nazi Literature in the Americas at Complete Review. Includes links to many reviews.

1996 books
Works by Roberto Bolaño
Works about Nazi Germany
Metafictional works